Amina Rachid (born Jamila Ben Omar, 11 April 1936 in Marrakech, died in 2019) was a Moroccan actress.

Career 
Rachid showed a passion for theater and acting from her early childhood, eventually starring in school plays. In the early 1960s, the Moroccan national radio announced its need for new recruits. Rachid accepted the offer and made her debut in radio theater, alongside her lifelong colleague, Habiba El Madkouri, who died in 2011. In 1971, Rachid trained as an actress abroad before returning to Morocco to work at the Société nationale de radiodiffusion et de télévision (SNRT), where she met her future husband and life partner, Abdellah Chakroun.

She is best known for her roles in several feature films, the most famous being In search of my wife's husband, Lalla Houby, Destin de femme, Elle est diabétique, hypertendue et elle refuse de crever, and Aida.

Death 
The actress died at the age of 83 in August 2019, after a long illness.

References

External links 
 

1936 births
2019 deaths
Moroccan television actresses
Moroccan film actresses
People from Marrakesh